NCBS may refer to:
 National Centre for Biological Sciences, a research centre based in Bangalore, India
 National Council for Black Studies, an organization that promotes black studies based in Atlanta, United States
 National Counties Building Society, a building society based in Epsom, England